The Peruvian Amazon Company, also called the Anglo-Peruvian Amazon Rubber Co, was a rubber boom company that operated in Peru in the late 1800s and early 1900s. Based in Iquitos, it became notorious for the ill treatment of its indigenous workers in the Amazon Basin, whom its field forces treated as slaves. The company's practices were exposed in 1913 by the investigative report of British consul-general Roger Casement and an article and book by journalist W. E. Hardenburg.

The Arana Brothers company, who had sought capital in London, were fused with the PAC in 1907.
Peruvian rubber baron Julio César Arana ran the company in Peru. British members of the Board of Directors included Sir J. Lister Kaye.

The company operated in the area of the Putumayo River, a river that flows from the Andes to join the Amazon River deep in the tropical jungle. This area was contested at the time among  Peru, Colombia, Ecuador, and it was inhabited by numerous indigenous people.

Casement Report

The company participated in abuses and criminal actions against laborers in the area, with its Peruvian overseers using force and even killing to suppress the workers. An investigative report by Roger Casement, British consul, exposed the abuses, embarrassing British members of the company's board. They put pressure on Arana to improve operations. A movement grew to stop the abuse and eventually led to the end of the company. The Anti-Slavery and Aborigines Protection Society was one of the activist groups working to stop the abuses.

W. E. Hardenburg wrote a scathing article in the British magazine Truth. The British government in 1910 sent the consul-general Roger Casement to investigate. His report also denounced the operations of the PAC. A 1912 book by Hardenburg, which contained edited extracts of Casement's report, was described by its editor as "perhaps the most terrible page in the whole history of commercialism." A Select Committee of the House of Commons published a paper on the investigations in 1913. The British Board of Directors was considered not criminally liable under the Slave Trade Acts due to the fact they were uninvolved the actual operations in Peru. However, the Parliament and others moved to tighten up anti-slavery laws. World War I interrupted this work.

Rubber industry
Among the findings by the various investigatory parties were widespread debt bondage, slavery, torture, mutilation, and many other crimes in the Amazonian Rubber industry, with the Putumayo area being but one example. The demand for rubber was enormous due to its use in tyres for trucks, cars and bicycles, whose manufacture had grown greatly in this period. Religious leaders such as Manuel Polit, Bishop of Cuenca in Ecuador, denounced these activities and worked to reform the system. Organizations such as the Sociedad Pro-Indigena also worked to improve conditions for indigenous workers. The area governments also attempted to implement measures to control the abuses, but it was difficult in the large, sparsely populated countryside, which had few road connections to major cities.

Arana was appointed liquidator in September 1911, and the company was forced into closure by a judge in 1913. After the company was closed, the receiver stated that the shareholders would receive nothing, and the creditors would receive small amounts. He blamed the downfall on the British directors, the Chairman of whom was known as J. Russell Gubbins.

References

Further reading

. An account of the life of Roger Casement and in particular his investigation into the atrocities against the indigenous tribes perpetrated by those engaged in rubber harvesting.

External links 
 

British companies disestablished in 1913
1913 disestablishments in England
Unfree labour
Trading companies disestablished in the 20th century
Trading companies of the United Kingdom
Slavery in Brazil
Slavery in Peru